The John Clifford Grimsley House, at 432 10th St. in Fayette, Alabama, was listed on the National Register of Historic Places in 2018.

It was designed and built for John Clifford Grimsley, a prominent local businessman. It is a two-story brick veneer building, with Classical Revival style, built around 1916.  It is the only high-style Classical Revival house in the county, although the style was "extremely popular in the United States around the turn of the twentieth century, especially in the Post Reconstruction South. The classical styling evoked an increasingly idealized antebellum South and the power and control exhibited by the Greek Revival style so popular before the Civil War."

It was deemed notable for its architecture and for association with its architect, John David Gullett. It has been asserted to be "one of the most iconic and recognizable houses in Fayette County."  In 2018 it was still in the Grimsley family, being owned by two of John Clifford Grimsley's granddaughters.

References

Neoclassical architecture in Alabama
National Register of Historic Places in Fayette County, Alabama
Residential buildings completed in 1916